Risas amargas (English: Bitter Laughter) is a Mexican telenovela produced by Televisa and broadcast by Telesistema Mexicano in 1961.

Cast 
 Isabela Corona
 Blanca de Castejón
 Miguel Córcega
 Manola Saavedra
 Miguel Ángel Ferriz
 Raúl Farell

References

External links 

Mexican telenovelas
1961 telenovelas
Televisa telenovelas
1961 Mexican television series debuts
1961 Mexican television series endings
Spanish-language telenovelas